Thomas Newton Hill, Jr. (June 2, 1927 – April 20, 2009) was an Indian-born American character actor and director on stage for decades before starting in film in the mid-1960s and on television in the 1980s.

Early life
Thomas Newton Hill, Jr. was born in India in 1927, to Disciples of Christ missionaries Thomas Newton Hill, Sr. and Elma Alexander Hill. Thomas, Jr. attended Woodstock School until 1940, when he was 13; he and his parents moved to Fort Wayne, Indiana.

Career

Hill's first feature film performance was in the 1965 film The Slender Thread. Other film credits include The Postman Always Rings Twice (1981), Firefox (1982), and as the bookstore owner Mr. Coreander in The NeverEnding Story and its sequel.

One of Hill's most prominent recurring roles was as the zany sidekick Jim Dixon on the 1980s TV series Newhart. Hill appeared as King Baaldorf in the short-lived 1980s fantasy TV series Wizards and Warriors. 

His TV movie roles include Father Andrew Doyle in the 1984 NBC miniseries V: The Final Battle. He had guest appearances on such shows as St. Elsewhere, Remington Steele, The Facts of Life, Married... with Children, Coach, and Law & Order.

Personal life
In 2003, Hill retired to Bloomington, Indiana. He died from a heart attack on April 20, 2009, at age 81.

Filmography

References

External links

1927 births
2009 deaths
American male stage actors
American male film actors
American male television actors
People from Bloomington, Indiana
American theatre directors
20th-century American male actors
American expatriates in colonial India